Mallikoulu is a Finnish television reality show. The first season aired in 2005 on MTV3, and was followed by a half-hour follow up show on the smaller channel Sub.

The show shared some similarities to the famous American TV series America's Next Top Model hosted by Tyra Banks, however, it was not made from the same format but from a new one created by former Finnish top model Marita Hakala. Instead of making the show only for the viewers as in America's Next Top Model, its aim was teaching shy Finnish girls how to make it in the big world of Fashion based on Hakala's own experiences as a model.

Season 1
The first season of the show aired in 2005 and garnered a total of 625 000 viewers, with Suvi Koponen being announced as the winner. Koponen won a contract with leading model agency Women in Milan, Paris and New York City. Koponen later established an incredible modeling career. She worked for numerous designers including Anna Sui, Vera Wang, Marc Jacobs, Donna Karan, Anne Klein, Blumarine, Miu Miu, BCBG Max Azria, Calvin Klein, Louis Vuitton, Nina Ricci and Prada. Koponen has also had an editorial in French Vogue shot by David Sims, and has appeared in the American edition of Vogue.

Contestants

Season 2
The second season of Mallikoulu aired in 2006. The winner was 16-year-old Sanni Salminen. Salminen did not manage to surpass the success of the previous winner, Suvi Koponen, but also worked as an international model briefly before returning to school to finish her studies.

Contestants
Jonna Ylimäki - 11th
Jelena - 10th
Kaisa - 9th
Heidi Palola - 8th
Joanna Linnainmaa - 7th
Anni Hietamies - 6th
Anette - 5th (replacement)
Liisa Nurminen - 4th
Hanna Kuvaja - 3rd
Essi Erlands - Runner-up
Sanni Salminen - Winner

Season 3
A third season adaption was confirmed by MTV3 to air on 29 March 2015. Anne Kukkohovi, the former host of Finland's Next Top Model, took on the position of the host with Jenni Dahlman serving as a judge. Applicants were required to be at least 16 years old to apply; the show aired on MTV AVA. The winner of the competition was 20-year-old Maya Tuominen.

Contestants

 The contestant was immune from elimination.
 The contestant was eliminated from the competition.
 The contestant won the competition.

References

External links
 Official website
 Mallikoulu on Katsomo
 Mallikoulu on IMDb
 Suvi Koponen on Models.com

Finnish reality television series
Modeling-themed reality television series